Sven Ludwig Vandenbroeck (born 22 September 1979) is a Belgian football coach and former player.

Playing career
Born in Vilvoorde, Vandenbroeck played as a defensive midfielder for Mechelen, Roda JC, De Graafschap, Akratitos, Lierse, Visé and Løv-Ham.

Coaching career
Vandenbroeck served as manager of Niki Volou, and assistant manager to Oud-Heverlee Leuven and the Cameroonian national team. He was the assistant to Hugo Broos when Cameroon won the 2017 Africa Cup of Nations.

He was appointed manager of the Zambian national team in July 2018. He said he would be starting from "year zero". In February 2019 it was announced that the Football Association of Zambia would not renew Vandenbroeck's contract in March 2019, due to his failure to qualify for the 2019 Africa Cup of Nations. Vandenbroeck later claimed that he had already resigned but had agreed to stay on until the end of his contract. He was then placed on administrative leave. He said that his eight months in Zambia were "positive".

In December 2019 he was appointed manager of Tanzanian club Simba. He left the club on 7 January 2021, becoming manager of Moroccan club AS FAR two days later.

On 16 July 2022, Vandenbroeck was appointed as manager of Saudi Arabian club Abha. On 8 October 2022, Vandenbroeck was sacked after a 3–0 defeat to Al-Nassr.

References

1979 births
Living people
Belgian footballers
K.V. Mechelen players
Roda JC Kerkrade players
De Graafschap players
A.P.O. Akratitos Ano Liosia players
Lierse S.K. players
C.S. Visé players
Løv-Ham Fotball players
Association football midfielders
Belgian football managers
Zambia national football team managers
Simba S.C. managers
Abha Club managers
Saudi Professional League managers
Belgian expatriate footballers
Belgian expatriate football managers
Belgian expatriate sportspeople in the Netherlands
Expatriate footballers in the Netherlands
Belgian expatriate sportspeople in Greece
Expatriate footballers in Greece
Expatriate football managers in Greece
Belgian expatriate sportspeople in Norway
Expatriate footballers in Norway
Belgian expatriate sportspeople in Cameroon
Expatriate football managers in Cameroon
Belgian expatriate sportspeople in Zambia
Expatriate football managers in Zambia
Belgian expatriate sportspeople in Tanzania
Expatriate football managers in Tanzania
Belgian expatriate sportspeople in Morocco
Expatriate football managers in Morocco
Belgian expatriate sportspeople in Saudi Arabia
Expatriate football managers in Saudi Arabia
Oud-Heverlee Leuven non-playing staff
People from Vilvoorde
Footballers from Flemish Brabant